Balbaridae is an extinct family of basal Macropodoidea. The synapomorphies are divided into two areas, the dental and cranial. The dental area of this taxa can be described as having the molar lophodont and brachyodont with a hypolophid formed by lingually displaced component of posthypocristid and linked to a buccal crest from the entoconid. Molars have a hypocingulid, first lower molar compressed with the "forelink" absent. First incisor with lingual and dorsal enamel ridgelets. The third lower premolar of some taxa have a posterobuccal cusp (cusp at the back close to the cheek). The skull is defined by four shared characteristics, a large sinuses, postorbital lateral constriction of the skull, a hypertrophy of the mastoid processes and no auditory bulla formed by an inflated tympanic wing of the alisphenoid.

Subfamily indeterminate
†Galanarla

Subfamily Nambarinae
 †Nambaroo
 †Wururoo
W. dayamayi
 †Ganawamaya

Subfamily Balbarinae
 †Balbaroo
†Balbaroo fangaroo

References

Prehistoric mammals of Australia
Chattian first appearances
Miocene extinctions
Prehistoric macropods
Prehistoric mammal families